Sander Bernard Jozef Boschker (born 20 October 1970) is a Dutch former professional footballer who played as a goalkeeper. He is currently the goalkeeping coach at Twente.

During a professional career which spanned 25 years he played mostly for Twente, appearing in 555 Eredivisie games and winning four major titles.

Boschker was part of the Dutch squad at the 2010 World Cup.

Club career
Born in Lichtenvoorde, Oost Gelre, Gelderland, Boschker made his professional debuts with FC Twente in the 1989–90 season, appearing in one game with the first team. After an irregular beginning he firmly established himself in the side's starting XI, going on to play in more than 400 official matches for the Eredivisie club.

Aged almost 33 Boschker moved to AFC Ajax, but had to settle with battling for being backup with the Amsterdam club, unable to dislodge youth product Maarten Stekelenburg. The following summer he returned to Twente, adding next to 200 more official appearances (in the 2008–09 campaign, he only missed five league contests for an eventual runner-up finish), and playing into his 40s.

In 2009–10, Boschker played in all 34 games as Twente won the first league title in the club's history – he only conceded 23 goals, second-best in the competition. Since 2010, though, he acted as understudy to Nikolay Mihaylov, and spent most of the following year rehabbing after two calf injuries.

On 25 June 2012, Boschker extended his link for another year. He retired at the end of the 2013–14 season.

International career
Although Boschker never made an appearance for the Netherlands until 2010, he was included in Marco van Basten's provisional squad for UEFA Euro 2008. However, following the friendly against Ukraine on 21 May, the manager released him, as he was deemed only the fourth-choice goalkeeper.

After a stellar 2009–10 club season, 39-year-old Boschker was included in the provisional squad of 30 players for the 2010 FIFA World Cup. On 27 May 2010, national team manager Bert van Marwijk announced that the player would be part of the final squad of 23, and Boschker appeared in a friendly with Ghana in Rotterdam (4–1 victory), replacing Michel Vorm at half-time; as a result, he became both the oldest player to ever make his debut and play for the Dutch national team.

Post-playing career
After retiring from playing, Boschker became active in the commercial department of Twente and goalkeepers coach of the women's team. In July 2015 he was appointed as assistant coach of Jong Twente. In June 2017, he became goalkeepers coach of the Twente first team.

Honours
Twente
Eredivisie: 2009–10
KNVB Cup: 2000–01, 2010–11
UEFA Intertoto Cup: 2006
Johan Cruyff Shield: 2011

Ajax
Eredivisie: 2003–04

Netherlands
FIFA World Cup runner-up: 2010

References

External links
Beijen profile 
Stats at Voetbal International 

Official fansite 

1970 births
Living people
People from Lichtenvoorde
Footballers from Oost Gelre
Dutch footballers
Netherlands international footballers
Association football goalkeepers
FC Twente players
AFC Ajax players
Eredivisie players
2010 FIFA World Cup players
FC Twente non-playing staff